The phonology of Standard German is the standard pronunciation or accent of the German language. It deals with current phonology and phonetics as well as with historical developments thereof as well as the geographical variants and the influence of German dialects.

This standardised pronunciation was invented, rather than coming from any particular German-speaking city. But the pronunciation that Germans usually consider to be closest to the standard is that of Hanover.

Vowels

Monophthongs

Likewise, some scholars treat  as an allophone of the sequence  or as a vocalized variant of /r/.

Notes
 Close vowels
  is close front unrounded .
  is close near-front rounded .
  is close back rounded .
  has been variously described as near-close front unrounded  and near-close near-front unrounded .
  is near-close near-front rounded .
  is near-close near-back rounded .
 Mid vowels
  is close-mid front unrounded .
 In non-standard accents of the Low German speaking area, as well as in some Bavarian and Austrian accents it may be pronounced as a narrow closing diphthong .
  has been variously described as close-mid near-front rounded  and mid near-front rounded .
 In non-standard accents of the Low German speaking area, as well as in some Austrian accents it may be pronounced as a narrow closing diphthong .
  is close-mid back rounded .
 In non-standard accents of the Low German speaking area, as well as in some Austrian accents it may be pronounced as a narrow closing diphthong .
  has been variously described as mid central unrounded . and  close-mid central unrounded . If a sonorant follows in the syllable coda, the schwa often disappears so that the sonorant becomes syllabic, for instance   ('pillow'),   ('donkey').
  has been variously described as mid near-front unrounded  and open-mid front unrounded .
  has been variously described as mid front unrounded  and open-mid front unrounded .
  has been variously described as open-mid near-front rounded  and somewhat lowered open-mid near-front rounded .
  has been variously described as somewhat fronted open-mid back rounded  and open-mid back rounded .
 Open vowels
  is near-open central unrounded . It is a common allophone of the sequence  common to all German-speaking areas but Switzerland. As schwa  is never pronounced here, it may be more appropriate to interpret  as the vocalised allophone of the consonant /r/.
  has been variously described as open front unrounded  and open central unrounded . Some scholars differentiate two short , namely front  and back .
 Standard Austrian pronunciation of this vowel is back .
  has been variously described as open central unrounded  and open back unrounded . Because of this, it is sometimes transcribed .
 Back  is the Standard Austrian pronunciation.
That is, and  have final syllables which are perceptually very similar, and are nearly or completely identical in some dialects." (As early as 1847, Verdi's librettist found it natural, when adapting a play by Schiller into the Italian language, to render the distinctly German name Roller as Rolla.)

Although there is also a length contrast, vowels are often analyzed according to a tenseness contrast, with long  being the tense vowels and short  their lax counterparts. They are usually considered allophones of tense vowels, which cannot occur in unstressed syllables (unless in compounds).

Northern German varieties influenced by Low German could be analyzed as lacking contrasting vowel quantity entirely:
 These varieties also consistently lack , and use only  in its place.

Phonemic status of 
However, the disputed vowel   seems much more stable in other contexts, i.e., not preceding /r/ as in the examples above. Other relevant minimal pairs include beten ('pray') - bäten ('bid, conjunctive'), dehnen ('stretch') - Dänen ('Danes'), Segen ('blessing') - Sägen ('saws, n.'). It has been debated whether  is a distinct phoneme or even exists, except when consciously self-censoring speech, for several reasons:
 The existence of a phoneme  is an irregularity in a vowel system that otherwise has pairs of long and tense vs. short and lax vowels such as  vs. . On the other hand, such irregularities are not ruled out by any principle.
 Although some dialects (e.g.
Such persons apparently have to picture the spellings of the words in question, which impedes the flow of speech. However, the examples above with a non-rhotic context for the disputed vowel distinction speak against this view.

Diphthongs

Phonemic

Phonetic
The following usually are not counted among the German diphthongs as German speakers often feel they are distinct marks of "foreign words". These appear only in loanwords:
However,  and  do not recognize these diphthongs as phonemes, and prescribe pronunciations with the long vowels  and  instead.

The factual basis of this presumed distinction seems very questionable." He goes on stating that in his own dialect, there is no length difference in these words, and that judgements on vowel length in front of non-prevocalic  which is itself vocalized are problematic, in particular if  precedes.

Non-prevocalic  and  may also merge, but the vowel chart in  shows that they have somewhat different starting points – mid-centralized open-mid front  for the former, open-mid front  for the latter.

 also states that "laxing of the vowel is predicted to take place in shortened vowels; it does indeed seem to go hand in hand with the vowel shortening in many cases." This merger is usual in the Standard Austrian accent, in which e.g. 'teacher' is pronounced  (the corresponding Standard Northern pronunciation is ). 'scarce' is pronounced .

Consonants
With around 22 to 26 phonemes, the German consonant system has an average number of consonants in comparison with other languages. One of the more noteworthy ones is the unusual affricate .

 can be uvular, alveolar or even dental, a consonant or a semivowel, see below.
 is bilabial–labiodental , rather than purely labiodental .
 can be apical alveolar , laminal alveolar  or laminal denti-alveolar . The other possible pronunciation of  that has been reported to occur in unstressed intervocalic positions is retroflex . Austrian German often uses the laminal denti-alveolar articulation.
 is always clear , as in most Irish English accents. A few Austrian accents may use a velarized  instead, but that is considered non-standard.
In the Standard Austrian variety,  may be affricated to  before front vowels.
 can be laminal alveolar , laminal post-dental  (i.e. fronted alveolar, articulated with the blade of the tongue just behind upper front teeth), or even apical alveolar . Austrian German often uses the post-dental articulation.  are always strongly fricated.
There are two variants of these sounds:
Laminal, articulated with the foremost part of the blade of the tongue approaching the foremost part of the hard palate, with the tip of the tongue resting behind either upper or lower front teeth.
Apico-laminal, articulated with the tip of the tongue approaching the gums and the foremost part of the blade approaching the foremost part of the hard palate.
 has a number of possible realizations:
 Voiced apical coronal trill , either alveolar (articulated with the tip of the tongue against the alveolar ridge), or dental (articulated with the tip of the tongue against the back of the upper front teeth).
 Distribution: Common in the south (Bavaria and many parts of Switzerland and Austria), but it is also found in some speakers in central and northern Germany, especially the elderly. Even more common are uvular realizations, fricatives  and a trill .
 Voiced uvular trill , which can be realized as voiceless  after voiceless consonants (as in ). According to  it is often a flap  intervocalically (as in ).
 Distribution: Occurs in some conservative varieties - most speakers with a uvular  realize it as a fricative or an approximant.
 Dorsal continuant, about the quality of which there is not a complete agreement:
  describe two fricative variants, namely post-palatal  and velar . The post-palatal variant appears before and after front vowels, while the velar variant is used in all other positions.
  describe it as voiced post-velar fricative . 
  and  describe it as voiced uvular fricative ;
  states that "with educated professional radio and TV announcers, as with professional actors on the stage and in film, the [voiced uvular] fricative [realization of]  clearly predominates."
 In the Standard Austrian accent, the uvular fricative is also the most common realization, although its voicing is variable (that is, it can be either voiced  or voiceless ).
  writes that "the place of articulation of the consonant varies from uvular in e.g.  ('red') to velar in e.g.  ('kick'), depending on back or front vowel contexts." He also notes that  is devoiced after voiceless plosives and fricatives, especially those within the same word, giving the word  as an example. According to this author,  can be reduced to an approximant in an intervocalic position.
  describe it as a uvular fricative  or approximant . The latter is less likely to occur word-initially.
 Distribution: Almost all areas apart from Bavaria and parts of Switzerland.
 Distribution: Widespread, but less common in Switzerland.
Many southern dialects do not aspirate , and some northern ones do so only in a stressed position.
The obstruents  are voiceless lenis consonants  in southern varieties. Voiceless lenis consonants  continue to contrast with voiceless fortis consonants . The section  covers the issue in more detail.
In Austria, intervocalic  can be lenited to fricatives .
Before and after front vowels ( and, in varieties that realize them as front,  and/or ), the velar consonants  are realized as post-palatal .
a fricative ,
a sound variable between a weak fricative and an approximant, and
an approximant , which is the usual realization in the Standard Austrian variety.
In many varieties of standard German, the glottal stop, occurs in careful speech before word stems that begin with a vowel and before stressed vowels word-internally, as in Oase [ʔo.ʔaː.zə] (twice). It is much more frequent in northern varieties than in the south. It is not usually considered a phoneme. In colloquial and dialectal speech,  is often omitted, especially when the word beginning with a vowel is unstressed.
The phonemic status of affricates is controversial.
Although  occurs in native words, it only appears in historic clusters of  +  (e.g. deutsch < OHG diutisc) or in words with expressive quality (e.g. glitschen, hutschen).  is, however, well-established in loanwords, including German toponyms of non-Germanic origin (e.g. Zschopau).
 and  occur only in words of foreign origin.
For a more detailed analysis see below at ich-Laut and ach-Laut. According to some analyses,  is an allophone of  after  and according to some also after .
It becomes  otherwise. For example:
 
 
 
 
  ~

Ich-Laut and ach-Laut
In German, these two sounds are allophones occurring in complementary distribution. The allophone  also appears after vocalized  in superregional variants, e.g. in   'fear'.

Usually, this ending triggers umlaut (compare for instance   'dog' to   'little dog'), so theoretically, it could only occur after front vowels. This exception to the allophonic distribution may be an effect of the morphemic boundary or an example of phonemicization, where erstwhile allophones undergo a split into separate phonemes.

The allophonic distribution of  after front vowels and  after other vowels is also found in other languages, such as Scots, in the pronunciation of light. However, it is by no means inevitable: Dutch, Yiddish, and many Southern German dialects retain  (which can be realized as  instead) in all positions.

According to Kohler, the German  is further differentiated into two allophones,  and :  occurs after  (for instance in   'book') and  after  (for instance in   'brook'), while either  or  may occur after , with  predominating.

Fortis–lenis pairs
These pairs are often called fortis–lenis pairs, since describing them as voiced–voiceless pairs is inadequate.

The fortis stops  are aspirated in many varieties. The aspiration is strongest in the onset of a stressed syllable (such as   'thaler'), weaker in the onset of an unstressed syllable (such as   'father'), and weakest in the syllable coda (such as in   'seed'). All fortis consonants, i.e.  are fully voiceless.

The lenis consonants  range from being weakly voiced to almost voiceless  after voiceless consonants:   ('kasbah'),   ('to resign'),   ('red-yellow'),   ('dropping'),   ('intention'),   ('wooden jalousie'),   ('to chase away'),   ('to drop'),   ('fruit juice').  states that they are "to a large extent voiced"  in all other environments, but some studies have found the stops  to be voiceless word/utterance-initially in most dialects (while still contrasting with  due to the aspiration of the latter).

 are voiceless in most southern varieties of German.

The nature of the phonetic difference between the voiceless lenis consonants and the similarly voiceless fortis consonants is controversial. It is generally described as a difference in articulatory force, and occasionally as a difference in articulatory length; for the most part, it is assumed that one of these characteristics implies the other.

In various central and southern varieties, the opposition between fortis and lenis is neutralized in the syllable onset; sometimes just in the onset of stressed syllables, sometimes in all cases.

The pair  is not considered a fortis–lenis pair, but a simple voiceless–voiced pair, as  remains voiced in all varieties, including the Southern varieties that devoice the lenes (with however some exceptions). Generally, the southern  is realized as the voiced approximant . However, there are southern varieties which differentiate between a fortis  (such as in   'culpable' from Middle High German stræflich) and a lenis  (such as in   'polite' from Middle High German hovelîch); this is analogous to the opposition of fortis  and lenis .

Coda devoicing
In varieties from Northern Germany, lenis stops in the syllable coda are realized as fortis stops. This does not happen in varieties from Southern Germany, Austria or Switzerland.

Since the lenis stops  are unvoiced or at most variably voiced (as stated above), this cannot be called devoicing in the strict sense of the word because it does not involve the loss of phonetic voice. More accurately, it can be called coda fortition or a neutralization of fortis and lenis sounds in the coda. Fricatives are truly and contrastively voiced in Northern Germany. Therefore, the fricatives undergo coda devoicing in the strict sense of the word. It is disputed whether coda devoicing is due to a constraint which specifically operates on syllable codas or whether it arises from constraints which "protect voicing in privileged positions".

Coda voicing
As against standard pronunciation rules, in western varieties including those of the Rhineland, coda fortis–lenis neutralization results in voicing rather than devoicing if the following word begins with a vowel. For example,  becomes  and  becomes . The same sandhi phenomenon exists also as a general rule in the Luxembourgish language.

Stress
In German words there is always one syllable carrying main stress, with all other syllables either being unstressed or carrying a secondary stress. The position of the main stress syllable has been a matter of debate. Traditionally, word stress is seen as falling onto the first stem syllable. In recent analyses, there is agreement that main stress is placed onto one of the last three (stressable) syllables. Within this three-syllable window, word stress is put regularly onto the second-to-last syllable, the penultimate syllable. However, syllable quantity may modify this pattern: a heavy final or prefinal syllable, i.e., one with a long vowel or with one or more consonants in the syllable coda, will usually attract main stress.

Examples
 final stress: Eleˈfant, Krokoˈdil, Kaˈmel
 penultimate stress: ˈTurban, ˈKonsul, ˈBison
 antepenultimate stress: ˈPinguin,  ˈRisiko, ˈMonitor

A set of illustrative examples also stems from Japanese loan words, as these cannot be borrowed with their stress patterns (Japanese has a system of pitch accents, completely different from word stress in Germanic languages):

final stress: Shoˈgun, Samuˈrai
 penultimate stress: Mitsuˈbishi, Ikeˈbana
 antepenultimate stress: Hiˈroshima,  ˈOsaka

A list of Japanese words in German reveals that none of the words with four syllables has initial stress, confirming the three-syllable-window analysis. 

Secondary stresses precede the main stress if at least two syllables are present, as in ̩Bib-li- ̩o-the-'ka-rin. 

Suffixes, if containing a stressable vowel, are either stressed (-ei, ion, -al, etc.) or unstressed (-ung, -heit, -isch, etc.) 

In addition, German uses different stresses for separable prefixes and inseparable prefixes in verbs and words derived from such verbs:
 A few homographs with such prefixes exist. They are not perfect homophones. Consider the word . As  (separable prefix), it means 'to rewrite' and is pronounced , with stress on the first syllable. Its associated noun,  is also stressed on the first syllable – . On the other hand,  (inseparable prefix) is pronounced , with stress on the second syllable. This word means 'to paraphrase', and its associated noun,  is also stressed on the second syllable – . Another example is the word ; with stress on the root it means 'to drive around (an obstacle in the street)', and with stress on the prefix it means 'to run down/over' or 'to knock down'.

Acquisition

General
Like all infants, German infants go through a babbling stage in the early phases of phonological acquisition, during which they produce the sounds they will later use in their first words. Phoneme inventories begin with stops, nasals, and vowels; (contrasting) short vowels and liquids appear next, followed by fricatives and affricates, and finally all other consonants and consonant clusters. Children begin to produce protowords near the end of their first year. These words do not approximate adult forms, yet have a specific and consistent meaning. Early word productions are phonetically simple and usually follow the syllable structure CV or CVC, although this generalization has been challenged. German children often use phonological processes to simplify their early word production. For example, they may delete an unstressed syllable ( 'chocolate' pronounced ), or replace a fricative with a corresponding stop (  'roof' pronounced ). One case study found that a 17-month-old child acquiring German replaced the voiceless velar fricative  with the nearest available continuant , or deleted it altogether (  'book' pronounced  or ). 

Prosodically, children prefer bisyllabic words with the pattern strong – weak over monosyllabic words.

Vowel space development
In 2009, Lintfert examined the development of vowel space of German speakers in their first three years of life. During the babbling stage, vowel distribution has no clear pattern. However, stressed and unstressed vowels already show different distributions in the vowel space. Once word production begins, stressed vowels expand in the vowel space, while the F1 – F2 vowel space of unstressed vowels becomes more centralized. The majority of infants are then capable of stable production of F1. The variability of formant frequencies among individuals decreases with age. After 24 months, infants expand their vowel space individually at different rates. However, if the parents' utterances possess a well-defined vowel space, their children produce clearly distinguished vowel classes earlier.

Nasals
The acquisition of nasals in German differs from that of Dutch, a phonologically closely related language. German children produce proportionately more nasals in onset position (sounds before a vowel in a syllable) than Dutch children do. German children, once they reached 16 months, also produced significantly more nasals in syllables containing schwas, when compared with Dutch-speaking children. This may reflect differences in the languages the children are being exposed to, although the researchers claim that the development of nasals likely cannot be seen apart from the more general phonological system the child is developing.

Phonotactic constraints and reading
A 2006 study examined the acquisition of German in phonologically delayed children (specifically, issues with fronting of velars and stopping of fricatives) and whether they applied phonotactic constraints to word-initial consonant clusters containing these modified consonants. In many cases, the subjects (mean age = 5.1) avoided making phonotactic violations, opting instead for other consonants or clusters in their speech. This suggests that phonotactic constraints do apply to the speech of German children with phonological delay, at least in the case of word-initial consonant clusters. Additional research has also shown that spelling consistencies seen in German raise children's phonemic awareness as they acquire reading skills.

Sound changes

Sound changes and mergers
Some speakers merge the two everywhere, some distinguish them everywhere, others keep  distinct only in conditional forms of strong verbs (for example   'I would give' vs.   'I give' are distinguished, but   'bears' vs.   'berries' are not.

This pronunciation is frequent all over central and northern Germany. It is characteristic of regional languages and dialects, particularly Low German in the North, where  represents a fricative, becoming voiceless in the syllable coda, as is common in German (final-obstruent devoicing). However common it is, this pronunciation is considered sub-standard. Only in one case, in the grammatical ending  (which corresponds to English -y), the fricative pronunciation of final  is prescribed by the Siebs standard, for instance   ('important'),   'importance'. The merger occurs neither in Austro-Bavarian and Alemannic German nor in the corresponding varieties of Standard German, and therefore in these regions  is pronounced .

Many speakers do not distinguish the affricate  from the simple fricative  in the beginning of a word, in which case the verb  ('[he] travels') and the noun  ('horse') are both pronounced . This most commonly occurs in northern and western Germany, where the local dialects did not originally have the sound .

Many speakers who have a vocalization of  after  merge this combination with long  (i.e.  >  or  >  or ). This merger does not occur where  is a front vowel while  is realised as a back vowel.

In umlaut forms, the difference usually reoccurs:   or  vs.  . Speakers with this merger also often use  (instead of formally normal ) where it stems from original .

In this latter case, however, many simplify the system in various degrees.

In everyday speech, more mergers occur, some of which are universal and some of which are typical for certain regions or dialect backgrounds. Overall, there is a strong tendency of reduction and contraction.

The commonest practice is to drop the stop (thus ,  for both words), but some speakers insert the stop where it is not etymological (for both words), or they alternate between the two ways. Only a few speakers retain a phonemic distinction.

Middle High German
The Middle High German vowels  and  developed into the modern Standard German diphthong , whereas  and  developed into . In some dialects, the Middle High German vowels have not changed, e.g.

The Middle High German diphthongs ,  and  became the modern Standard German long vowels ,  and  after the Middle High German long vowels changed to diphthongs. Most Upper German dialects retain the diphthongs. A remnant of their former diphthong character is shown when  continues to be written  in German (as in  'love').

Loanwords

German incorporates a significant number of loanwords from other languages. Loanwords are often adapted to German phonology but to varying degrees, depending on the speaker and the commonness of the word.  and  do not occur in native German words but are common in a number of French and English loan words.

Loanwords from English
Many English words are used in German, especially in technology and pop culture. Some speakers pronounce them similarly to their native pronunciation, but many speakers change non-native phonemes to similar German phonemes (even if they pronounce them in a rather English manner in an English-language setting):
 English  can be pronounced the same as in English, i.e. German and Austrian speakers tend to be variably rhotic when using English loanwords.
 English  is often replaced with German  e.g.  .
 word-initial  is often retained (especially in the South, where word-initial  is common), but many speakers replace it with  e.g.  .
 English  is usually retained, but in Northern and Western Germany as well as Luxembourg, it is often replaced with  e.g.  .
 In Northern Standard German, final-obstruent devoicing is applied to English loan words just as to other words e.g. However, in Southern Standard German, in Swiss Standard German and Austrian Standard German, final-obstruent devoicing does not occur and so speakers are more likely to retain the original pronunciation of word-final lenes (although realizing them as fortes may occur because of confusing English spelling with pronunciation).
 English  is usually pronounced as German  e.g.  .

Loanwords from French
French loanwords, once very numerous, have in part been replaced by native German coinages or more recently English loanwords.

Sample
The sample text is a reading of the first sentence of "The North Wind and the Sun". The phonetic transcription is a fairly narrow transcription of the educated northern accent. The speaker transcribed in the narrow transcription is 62 years old, and he is reading in a colloquial style. Aspiration, glottal stops and devoicing of the lenes after fortes are not transcribed.

The audio file contains the whole fable, and it was recorded by a much younger speaker.

Phonemic transcription

Phonetic transcription

Orthographic version

See also
German orthography

Notes

References

Further reading

External links

 Listen to the pronunciation of German first names